Pharnaces Ι (Elamite: Parnaka; –497 BCE) was a son of Arsames. He was a younger brother of Hystaspes, and therefore an uncle of Achaemenid Emperor Darius I, son of Hystaspes. He was the founder of the Pharnacid dynasty that ruled over Hellespontine Phrygia.

Mayor of the Palace

According to the fortification tablets found at Persepolis, Pharnaces was the chief economic official to Darius I between 506 and 497 BCE. He was a Mayor of the Palace, his statutory attribute being a short stick, probably made of a precious metal. He likely appears on some of the reliefs in Persepolis.

Hellespontine Phrygia
Pharnaces became involved at some point with Hellespontine Phrygia in Asia Minor (modern northwest Turkey), since Aristotle of Stagira mentions that Pharnaces introduced mules in the region. 

Pharnaces had a son named Artabazus, who was appointed as satrap of Hellespontine Phrygia by Xerxes I circa 477 BCE. Artabazus and his heirs, known as the "Pharnacid dynasty" after Pharnaces, would rule the region into the 4th century BCE and until its take-over by Alexander the Great.

References

Hellespontine Phrygia
Pharnacid dynasty
6th-century BC Iranian people
Officials of Darius the Great